"Seanchas" is a pop song by Irish group Clannad. It was released in 1996 and was their first single from their album Lore. The single's title means 'Storytelling' or 'Lore' in the Irish language and is pronounced 'shan-ahas'.

Track listing
 "Seanchas"
 "A Bridge (That Carries Us Over)"

References

External links

1996 singles
Clannad songs
1996 songs
RCA Records singles
Songs written by Ciarán Brennan